Canstar Community News is a newspaper company in Winnipeg, Manitoba, Canada. It owns and operates six community newspapers in the Winnipeg area.

History
Five of those newspapers, The Lance, The Metro, The Herald, The Headliner and The Times began as local area papers as early as 1917. Over the course of years, they became part of the Transcontinental Media newspaper company. In 2004, the papers were sold by Transcontinental to FP Canadian Newspapers, owners of the Winnipeg Free Press. Included in the deal were flyer distribution operations in Brandon and Thunder Bay. The new company was rebranded as Canstar Community News.

In 2009, the Lance was divided into two community newspapers to better cover the expanding and developing Winnipeg South area, and The Sou'wester was born.

Two niche publications, Uptown Magazine, an alternative news-and-entertainment weekly, and The Prime Times, a seniors' paper, were purchased from Rosebud Communications in 2005. The Prime Times ceased publication in November 2011 and Canstar and FP Canadian Newspapers launched a bi-monthly magazine, Winnipeg Boomer, on Nov. 26, 2011. Winnipeg Boomer ceased publication with its October 2012 issue and Uptown Magazine ceased publication as a standalone weekly newspaper on Oct. 25, 2012. It was relaunched as a section of the Thursday edition of the Winnipeg Free Press on Nov. 1, 2012.

In 2007, the newspapers' website, www.weeklies.ca, won first place, for best website in class, at the Canadian Community Newspaper Association (CCNA) awards. That website no longer exists, as the papers are now accessed through a new URL, canstarnews.com, or via the Winnipeg Free Press website.

In March 2007, the employees of Canstar Community News had a vote to determine union membership in the Communications, Energy and Paperworkers Union. The results of the vote have not been released, however, the employees did form a union.

Each of the local papers has a news reporter assigned to it along with a staff member who covers sports for the entire region. Total staff of Canstar is around 20 people. Circulation in 2012 was 185,000 copies weekly.

External links 
Canstar Community News Website

Newspapers published in Winnipeg
Newspaper companies of Canada